Caloptilia nobilella is a moth of the family Gracillariidae. It is found in Macedonia and the Istria peninsula in the Adriatic Sea.

The larvae feed on Laurus nobilis. They mine the leaves of their host plant. The mine consists of a winding, epidermal corridor, resembling a snail's trail, running towards the leaf margin. From here, a tentiform mine is made. The leaf margin folds over the mine. Older larvae leave the mine and continue feeding within a leaf folded into a cone. The pupa is made in an oval, almost glassy cocoon. Mines are only made in the youngest leaves, mainly in the shadow.

References

nobilella
Moths of Europe
Moths described in 1942